Acosmetoptera is a genus of moths in the family Lasiocampidae. The genus was erected by Yves de Lajonquière in 1972.

Species
Acosmetoptera anacardia
Acosmetoptera apicimacula (de Lajonquière, 1970)
Acosmetoptera apimacula de Lajonquière, 1970
Acosmetoptera ecpluta de Lajonquière, 1972
Acosmetoptera nubenda de Lajonquière, 1972
Acosmetoptera phela de Lajonquière, 1972
Acosmetoptera raharizoninai de Lajonquière, 1970

External links

Lasiocampidae
Moth genera